The following is a timeline of the COVID-19 pandemic in Malaysia during 2022.

Timeline

January

On 12 January 2022, Health Minister Khairy Jamaluddin confirmed that fully-vaccinate travellers and travellers who had previously contracted COVID-19 would not need to undergo mandatory quarantine. Those who had been infected with COVID-19 had to present evidence they had been infected 11 to 60 days prior to travelling to Malaysia and a "fit to travel" letter.

On 16 January, the Malaysian Ministry of Health updated its isolation procedures for COVID-19 positive cases. Fully-vaccinated individuals with no symptoms have to isolate for seven days while individuals with incomplete vaccinations or are asymptomatic cases have to isolate for ten days.

February

On 9 February, former Malaysian Prime Minister Muhyiddin Yassin tested positive for COVID-19.

On 13 February, the total number of cases in Malaysia exceeded the 3 million mark, reaching 3,040,235.

By 24 February, the total number of recoveries in Malaysia had exceeded the 3 million mark, reaching 3,018,172.

By 24 February, the number of cases among children below the age of 11 had risen from 2,492 cases on 13 February to 3,863 on 25 February.  In addition, cases among adolescents aged 12 to 17 rose from 1,496 on 13 February to 1,849 on 25 February. Similarly, cases among adults aged between 18 and 59 years rose from 12,634 on 13 February to 20,771 on 25 February. Likewise, cases among senior citizens (aged 60 years and above) rose from 1,334 on 13 February to 2,261 on 25 February.

March

On 15 March, Malaysia allowed fully vaccinated travellers from Thailand and Cambodia to enter the country without having to undergo quarantine.

On 16 March, Malaysia reported its first case of the BA5.2 variant of the SARS-CoV-2 Omicron variant.

On 21 March, the total number of cases exceeded the 4 million mark, reaching 4,010,952.

April

From 1 April, Malaysia allowed quarantine-free travel for fully-vaccinated travellers, ending two years of COVID-19 border restrictions. That same day, testing and isolation requirements for travellers on private transports were eased at the Malaysia-Singapore border.

On 3 April, the total number of recoveries exceeded the 4 million threshold, reaching 4,018,421.

May

From 1 May, the Malaysian Government eliminated pre-flight and on-arrival testing requirements for fully vaccinated travellers and those who have just recovered from COVID-19. While the Government lifted mask requirements for outdoor settings, they remained mandatory for indoor activities and public transport. In addition, unvaccinated individuals without COVID-19 symptoms were allowed to enter premises without using the MySejahtera app.

June

On 13 June, the Health Ministry's COVIDNow portal reported that the number of recoveries had outpaced new infections for a second day in a row; with 1,887 individuals recovering from Covid-19 on that day.

On 18 June, the Malaysian and Indian governments agreed to recognise each others' COVID-19 vaccination certificates.

July

By 30 July, there were 47,014 active cases with 96.8%  in home quarantine and 19 being treated at quarantine centres. In addition, three percent of patients (1,446) were being treated at hospital, with 62 in intensive care and 34 on ventilator support.

August

On 1 August, the Malaysian Government allowed all travelers to enter Malaysia regardless of vaccination status and eliminated pre-departure and on-arrival COVID-19 test requirements.

On 21 August, Malaysia reported its first case of the BF.7 variant of the Omicron variant of COVID-19.

September

October

On 6 October, the Ministry of Health retired the COVIDNOW website, with COVID-19 daily reports being transferred to the KKMNOW website, which is jointly run by the Health Ministry and the Department of Statistics.

November

By 26 November, the Sarawak state government confirmed that 86% of the state's population (roughly 2,430,627 people) have been fully vaccinated with two doses. In addition, 73% of eligible people aged 12 and above (roughly 1,584,620 people) had received the first booster dose. However, only 2% of the eligible population (roughly 51,372 people) had received the second booster dose.

On 30 November, Sarawak Deputy Premier Datuk Seri Dr Sim Kui Hian confirmed that the previous four weeks of November 2023 had seen a progressive increase in COVID-19 transmissions. 1,046 cases were reported between 1,046 cases while 814 cases, 616 cases, and 459 cases were reported in the previous three weeks respectively. The overall number of COVID-19 cases reported in Sarawak declined from a total of 46,668 cases between January and March 2022 to 7,999 cases reported between August to November 2022.

December
 

On 4 December, the total number of cases exceeded the five million mark, reaching 5,000,332.

On 5 December, Menteri Besar (Chief Minister) Datuk Seri Amirudin Shari estimated that the state of Selangor recorded six deaths on average per week, as well as between 1,000 and 2,000 new cases daily. Amirudin credited vaccination with reducing the state's 0.7% case-to-fatality ratio at the start of the COVID-19 pandemic to 0.1% at the start of the year.

On 13 December, Director-General Noor Hisham Abdullah confirmed that no Covid-19 cases had been detected among flood victims at relief centres since 19 November. He confirmed that 14 COVID-19 cases were detected at relief centres between 11 and 18 November but that the victims had completed their isolation and returned home.

On 27 December, Noor Hisham Abdullah announced that the Health Ministry would take steps to prepare for a possible surge in COVID-19 cases originating in China including boosting the country's vaccine booster rollout.

References

2022
2022 in Malaysia